The Canton of Dompaire is a French former administrative grouping of communes in the Vosges département of eastern France and in the region of Lorraine. It was disbanded following the French canton reorganisation which came into effect in March 2015. It had 5,981 inhabitants (2012).

Composition
The Canton of Dompaire comprised the following 30 communes:

 Les Ableuvenettes
 Ahéville
 Bainville-aux-Saules
 Bazegney
 Begnécourt 
 Bettegney-Saint-Brice
 Bocquegney
 Bouxières-aux-Bois
 Bouzemont
 Circourt
 Damas-et-Bettegney
 Derbamont
 Dompaire
 Gelvécourt-et-Adompt
 Gorhey
 Gugney-aux-Aulx
 Hagécourt
 Harol
 Hennecourt
 Jorxey 
 Légéville-et-Bonfays 
 Madegney
 Madonne-et-Lamerey 
 Maroncourt
 Racécourt 
 Regney
 Saint-Vallier 
 Vaubexy
 Velotte-et-Tatignécourt
 Ville-sur-Illon

History
The canton remains overwhelmingly rural, but in recent years has welcomed an increasing number of incomers drawn by the employment opportunities in the Épinal agglomeration. Between 1990 and 1999 the registered population grew by a net figure of 149 people, representing an increase of 2.9%.

References

Dompaire
2015 disestablishments in France
States and territories disestablished in 2015